Resistomycin is an antibiotic with the molecular formula C22H16O6. Resistomycin is similar to hypericin. Resistomycin was first isolated in 1951 from the bacterium Streptomyces resistomycificus.

References

Further reading 

 
 

Antibiotics
Polyols
Ketones
Pentacyclic compounds